Konner is a surname. Notable people with the surname include:

Jennifer Konner (born 1971), American screenwriter
Joan Konner (1931–2018), American academic and journalist
Lawrence Konner, American screenwriter
Melvin Konner (born 1946), American anthropologist

See also
Conor